Gods and Monsters is a 1998 period drama film that recounts the partly fictionalized last days of the life of film director James Whale, whose experience of war in World War I is a central theme. The film stars Ian McKellen, Brendan Fraser, Lynn Redgrave, Lolita Davidovich, and David Dukes. An international co-production between the United Kingdom and the United States, the film is written and directed by Bill Condon, based on Christopher Bram's 1995 novel Father of Frankenstein. The film is produced by Paul Colichman, Gregg Fienberg, and Mark R. Harris; Clive Barker served as executive producer. Despite positive reviews, the film was a box office failure.

Gods and Monsters was nominated for three Academy Awards, including Best Actor for McKellen and Best Supporting Actress for Redgrave, and won for Best Adapted Screenplay. The film features reconstructions of the production of the 1935 film Bride of Frankenstein, which Whale directed. The title Gods and Monsters is derived from a scene in Bride of Frankenstein, in which the character Dr. Pretorius toasts Dr. Frankenstein, "To a new world of gods and monsters!" The story has also been adapted as a play of the same name which premiered in London at the Southwark Playhouse in February 2015.

Plot
In the 1950s, James Whale, the director of Frankenstein and Bride of Frankenstein, has retired. Whale lives with his long-time housemaid, Hanna, who loyally cares for him but disapproves of his homosexuality. He has suffered a series of strokes that have left him fragile and tormented by memories: growing up as a poor outcast, his tragic World War I service, and the filming of Bride of Frankenstein. Whale slips into his past and indulges in his fantasies, reminiscing about gay pool parties and sexually teasing an embarrassed, starstruck fan. He battles depression, and at times contemplates suicide, as he realizes his life, his attractiveness, and his health are slipping away.

Whale befriends his young, handsome gardener, Clayton Boone, and the two begin a sometimes uneasy friendship as Boone poses for Whale's sketches. The two men bond while discussing their lives and dealing with Whale's spells of disorientation and weakness from the strokes. Boone, impressed with Whale's fame, watches Bride of Frankenstein on television as his friends mock the movie, his friendship with Whale, and Whale's intentions.

Boone assures Whale that he is straight and receives Whale's assurance that there is no sexual interest, but Boone storms out when Whale graphically discusses his sexual history. Boone later returns with the agreement that no such "locker room" discussions occur again. Boone is invited to escort Whale to a party hosted by George Cukor for Princess Margaret. There, a photo op has been arranged for Whale with "his Monsters": Boris Karloff and Elsa Lanchester from "ancient" movie fame. This event exacerbates Whale's depression. A sudden rainstorm becomes an excuse to leave.

Back at Whale's home, Clayton needs a dry change of clothes. Whale can only find a sweater, so Clayton wears a towel wrapped around his waist. Whale decides to try to sketch Clayton one more time. After some minutes, he shows his sketches to Clayton, disclosing that he has lost his ability to draw. After Clayton drops his towel to pose nude, Whale makes him wear a World War I gas mask and then uses the opportunity to make a sexual advance on Clayton, kissing his shoulder and neck, and forcefully reaches for his genitals. An enraged Clayton fights off Whale, who confesses that this had been his plan and begs Clayton to kill him to relieve him of his suffering. Clayton refuses, puts Whale to bed, then sleeps downstairs. The next morning, Hanna is alarmed when she cannot find Whale, prompting a search by Clayton and Hanna. Clayton finds Whale floating dead in the pool as a distraught Hanna runs out, clutching a suicide note. Clayton and Hanna agree that he should disappear from the scene to avoid a scandal.

A decade later, Clayton and his son, Michael, watch Bride of Frankenstein on television. Michael is skeptical of his father's claim that he knew Whale, but Clayton produces a sketch of the Frankenstein monster drawn by Whale, and signed, "To Clayton. Friend?". Clayton later walks down a street at night in the rain, miming the movements of Frankenstein's monster.

Cast

 Ian McKellen as James Whale
 Brandon Kleyla as young James Whale
 Kent George as 25-year-old James Whale
 Brendan Fraser as Clayton Boone
 Lynn Redgrave as Hanna
 Lolita Davidovich as Betty
 David Dukes as David Lewis
 Kevin J. O'Connor as Harry
 Mark Kiely as Dwight
 Jack Plotnick as Edmund Kay
 Rosalind Ayres as Elsa Lanchester
 Jack Betts as Boris Karloff
 Matt McKenzie as Colin Clive
 Martin Ferrero as George Cukor
 Cornelia Hayes O'Herlihy as Princess Margaret
 Amir Aboulela as The Monster
 Marlon Braccia as Starlet Elizabeth Taylor
 Jesse James as Michael Boone
 Arthur Dignam as Ernest Thesiger (uncredited)

Reception
Gods and Monsters received positive reviews from critics, with McKellen's, Fraser's and Redgrave's performances singled out for particular praise. Time Out called it "not a complicated film, but warm and clever".

The film has a 96% rating on Rotten Tomatoes, based on 67 reviews, with an average rating of 8.4/10. The site's critical consensus states: "Gods and Monsters is a spellbinding, confusing piece of semi-fiction, featuring fine performances; McKellen leads the way, but Redgrave and Fraser don't lag far behind." On Metacritic the film has a score of 74 out of 100, based on reviews from 32 critics, indicating "generally favorable reviews".

Accolades

Real life basis
James Whale had several men (and women) pose nude for him, and some of these are shown in the making-of featurette. Several of his paintings were bought by a collector and loaned to the studio for the making of this film.

Whale suffered from strokes towards the end of his life, which affected his mental abilities, and he was found dead in his pool. There were rumours that this was a homicide, but the evidence only pointed at suicide. 

In the documentary included on the DVD and in interviews, novelist Christopher Bram explains that the character of Clayton Boone is completely fictitious.

Notes

References

External links
 
 
 
 
 
 
 Gods and Monsters: A Queer Film Classic

1998 films
1990s biographical drama films
1998 LGBT-related films
British biographical drama films
British LGBT-related films
American biographical drama films
American LGBT-related films
1990s English-language films
Films about filmmaking
Films about suicide
Films based on American novels
Gay-related films
LGBT-related drama films
Films set in the 1950s
Films set in California
Films shot in California
Independent Spirit Award for Best Film winners
1998 independent films
Films featuring a Best Supporting Actress Golden Globe-winning performance
Films whose writer won the Best Adapted Screenplay Academy Award
Films directed by Bill Condon
Films with screenplays by Bill Condon
Films scored by Carter Burwell
Lionsgate films
Cultural depictions of film directors
1998 drama films
Biographical films about film directors and producers
1990s American films
1990s British films